Kılıçlar Deresi is one of two main tributaries of Yağlıdere stream borns in Erimez highland of Alucra district of Giresun Province of Turkey.

References

Rivers of Turkey
Rivers of Giresun Province